Mack Pemberton (July 1, 1912 – June 19, 1980) was a member of the Ohio House of Representatives.

References

Republican Party members of the Ohio House of Representatives
1912 births
1980 deaths
20th-century American politicians